Pierangelo Summa (19 August 1947 – 15 July 2015) also known as Piero Summa, was an Italian theatre director, theatre masks creator, and puppeteer. Born in Como, Italy, he is mostly known in Europe, where he his considered as one of the leaders of the Italian theater movement of the 70s, for his puppets, Commedia dell'arte masks and theatre directing. He first started his activity by the creation of a few puppet troupes, one of which, La Gabbia dei Giupitt, animated the TV Show Il Giudice di Roccastorta on Swiss television RSI, 1977. In the 1990's, his work progressively became more and more concentrated on theatre directing, in France, Italy, but also Germany, Libanon or Georgia. Since 2019, his son Robin Summa took over his Commedia dell'Arte masks creation in Naples, Italy, where he opened a shop dedicated to theatre masks' crafting, La maschera è libertà. He also edited some writings and lessons of his father in Italy. The book has got the same title as the shop. He died in Paris, France.

References 

1947 births
2015 deaths
Italian theatre directors
Puppeteers
People from Como
Commedia dell'arte